Graciela Camaño (born 25 April 1953) is an Argentine lawyer and politician, currently serving as a National Deputy for Buenos Aires Province since 2003. She previously served in the Chamber of Deputies from 1997 to 2000 and from 1989 to 1993. Camaño also served as Minister of Labour during the presidency of Eduardo Duhalde between May 2002 and May 2003.

She was born in Presidencia Roque Sáenz Peña, Chaco Province. She is married to Luis Barrionuevo, a prominent trade union leader in Argentina, who has been Senator for Catamarca. A longtime member of the Justicialist Party, she founded her own party with Barrionuevo in 2015, the Third Position Party. 

She graduated from University of Morón in 2013, where she is a professor of Constitutional law. She remains a close ally of former president Duhalde.

Electoral history

References 

1953 births
Living people
Members of the Argentine Chamber of Deputies elected in Buenos Aires Province
Members of the Argentine Council of Magistracy
People from Presidencia Roque Sáenz Peña
Women members of the Argentine Chamber of Deputies
Women government ministers of Argentina
Justicialist Party politicians
Renewal Front politicians